Radio Vogošća is a Bosnian local public radio station, broadcasting from Vogošća, Bosnia and Herzegovina.

Radio Vogošća was launched on 18 July 1996 by the municipal council of Vogošća. This radio station broadcasts a variety of programs such as music, local news, talk shows and sport. Program is mainly produced in Bosnian language and it is also available in Sarajevo and Sarajevo Canton region.

Estimated number of potential listeners of Radio Vogošća is around 386,197. Radiostation is also available via Bosnian IPTV platform Moja TV on channel 189.

TV Vogošća is also part of public municipality services.

Frequencies
The program is currently broadcast at one frequency:

 Vogošća

See also 
List of radio stations in Bosnia and Herzegovina

References

External links 
 www.rtvvogosca.ba
 Communications Regulatory Agency of Bosnia and Herzegovina

Vogošća
Mass media in Sarajevo
Radio stations established in 1996